Billie Jean King and Martina Navratilova were the defending champions but lost in the semifinals to Kathy Jordan and Anne Smith.

Jordan and Smith defeated Rosie Casals and Wendy Turnbull in the final, 4–6, 7–5, 6–1 to win the ladies' doubles tennis title at the 1980 Wimbledon Championships.

Seeds

  Billie Jean King /  Martina Navratilova (semifinals)
  Rosie Casals /  Wendy Turnbull (final)
  Pam Shriver /  Betty Stöve (quarterfinals)
  Kathy Jordan /  Anne Smith (champions)
  Greer Stevens /  Virginia Wade (quarterfinals)
  Chris Evert Lloyd /  Virginia Ruzici (quarterfinals)
  Sue Barker /  Ann Kiyomura (quarterfinals)
  Hana Mandlíková /  Renáta Tomanová (second round)

Draw

Finals

Top half

Section 1

Section 2

Bottom half

Section 3

Section 4

References

External links

1980 Wimbledon Championships – Women's draws and results at the International Tennis Federation

Women's Doubles
Wimbledon Championship by year – Women's doubles
Wimbledon Championships
Wimbledon Championships